Finland competed at the 2000 Summer Olympics in Sydney, Australia.

Medalist

Archery 

The Finnish archery squad in Sydney consisted of two men and one woman.  None of the archers won a match.

Athletics 

Men
Track and road events
Men's 100 m
 Tommi Hartonen
 Round 1 – 10.53 (→ did not advance)

Men's 200 m
 Tommi Hartonen
 Round 1 – 20.82
 Round 2 – 20.47 NR
 Semifinal – 20.88 (→ did not advance)

Men's 50 km Walk
 Valentin Kononen
 Final – DSQ

Field events
Men's Shot Put
 Arsi Harju
 Qualifying – 21.39
 Final – 21.29 (→  Gold Medal)
 Timo Aaltonen
 Qualifying – 20.04
 Final – 18.64 (→ 12th place)
 Ville Tiisanoja
 Qualifying – 19.66 (→ did not advance)

Men's Javelin Throw
 Aki Parviainen
 Qualifying – 83.73
 Final – 86.62 (→ 5th place)
 Harri Haatainen
 Qualifying – 79.93 (→ did not advance)
 Harri Hakkarainen
 Qualifying – DNF (→ did not advance, no ranking)

Men's Hammer Throw
 Olli-Pekka Karjalainen
 Qualifying – 69.64 (→ did not advance)

Men's High Jump
 Toni Huikuri
 Qualifying – 2.20 (→ did not advance)
 Mika Polku
 Qualifying – 2.24 (→ did not advance)

Combined – Decathlon
 Eduard Hämäläinen
 100 m – 11.01
 Long Jump – 7.19
 Shot Put – 14.06
 High Jump – 1.85
 400 m – 48.14
 100 m Hurdles – 14.37
 Discus Throw – 35.98
 Pole Vault – 4.80
 Javelin Throw – 47.11
 1,500 m – 04:54.18
 Points – 7520.00 (→ 24th place)
 Aki Heikkinen
 100 m – 11.15
 Long Jump – NM
 Shot Put – 13.37
 High Jump – DNS

Women
Track
Women's 100 m
 Heidi Hannula
 Round 1 – 11.68 (→ did not advance)

Women's 200 m
 Johanna Manninen
 Round 1 – 23.40
 Round 2 – 23.41 (→ did not advance)

Women's 100 m Hurdles
 Manuela Bosco
 Round 1 – 13.51 (→ did not advance)

Women's 4 × 100 m
 Manuela Bosco, Heidi Hannula, Sanna Kyllönen, Johanna Manninen
 Round 1 – 43.66
 Semifinal – 43.50 (→ did not advance)

Field events
Women's Javelin Throw
 Mikaela Ingberg
 Qualifying – 60.85
 Final – 58.56 (→ 9th place)
 Taina Uppa
 Qualifying – 57.39 (→ did not advance)

Women's Hammer Throw
 Mia Strömmer
 Qualifying – 59.43 (→ did not advance)
 Sini Pöyry
 Qualifying – 63.80
 Final – 62.49 (→ 12th place)

Combined – Heptathlon
Women's Heptathlon
 Tiia Hautala
 100 m Hurdles – 13.62
 High Jump – 1.78
 Shot Put – 13.31
 200 m – 25.00
 Long Jump – 6.12
 Javelin Throw – 45.40
 800 m – 02:14.90
 Points – 6173 (→ 8th place)
 Susanna Rajamäki
 100 m Hurdles – 13.60
 High Jump – 1.66
 Shot Put – 13.87
 200 m – 24.03
 Long Jump – 6.36
 Javelin Throw – 37.00
 800 m – 02:18.47
 Points – 6021 (→ 13th place)

Badminton 

Men's Singles
Jyri Aalto
 Round of 64: Bye 
 Round of 32: Lost to Wong Choong Hann of Malaysia

Women's Singles
Anu Weckström
 Round of 64: Bye 
 Round of 32: Lost to Kanako Yonekura of Japan

Boxing 

Men's Featherweight (– 57 kg)
Joni Turunen
Round 1 – Lost to Falk Huste of Germany (→ did not advance)

Canoeing

Flatwater 
Men's Kayak Singles 500 m
 Kimmo Latvamäki
 Qualifying Heat – 01:42.535
 Semifinal – 01:41.640 (→ did not advance)

Cycling

Road 
Women's Road Race
 Pia Sundstedt
 Final – 3:06:31 (→ 21st place)

Track 
Women's Sprint
Mira Kasslin
Qualifying – 12.194
1/8 Finals – Lost to Félicia Ballanger of France (→ did not advance)
1/8 Finals Repechage – Heat 1; 3rd place
Final 9-12 – (→ 11th place)

Women's 500 m Time Trial
Mira Kasslin
Final – 37.145 (→ 17th place)

Diving 

Men's 3 Metre Springboard
 Jukka Piekkanen
 Preliminary – 373.41 (→ 20th place, did not advance)

Men's 3 Metre Springboard
 Joona Puhakka
 Preliminary – 332.58 (→ 30th place, did not advance)

Sailing 

Eight men and two woman competed for Finland in the Sailing competition. They won one gold medal.

Men's Double Handed Dinghy (470)
 Petri Leskinen and Kristian Heinilä
 Race 1 – (25)
 Race 2 – 23 
 Race 3 – 10 
 Race 4 – 3 
 Race 5 – 17 
 Race 6 – 4 
 Race 7 – 23 
 Race 8 – 20 
 Race 9 – (28)
 Race 10 – 3 
 Race 11 – 24 
 Final – 127 (→ 16th place)

Men's Laser
 Roope Suomalainen
 Race 1 – (44) DSQ
 Race 2 – 13 
 Race 3 – 5 
 Race 4 – 16 
 Race 5 – 18 
 Race 6 – 3 
 Race 7 – 14 
 Race 8 – 23 
 Race 9 – (25)
 Race 10 – 19 
 Race 11 – 16 
 Final – 127 (→ 17th place)

Men's Three Handed Keelboat (Soling)
 Erkki Heinonen, Jali Makilä and Sami Tamminen
 Did not advance to round robin.

Women's Mistral
 Minna Aalto
 Race 1 – 9 
 Race 2 – 18 
 Race 3 – 20 
 Race 4 – 12 
 Race 5 – (21)
 Race 6 – 7 
 Race 7 – 15 
 Race 8 – 12 
 Race 9 – 17 
 Race 10 – 11 
 Race 11 – (30) DSQ
 Final – 121 (→ 15th place)

Women's Single Handed Dinghy (Europe)
 Sari Multala
 Race 1 – 2 
 Race 2 – 7 
 Race 3 – (16)
 Race 4 – 12 
 Race 5 – (20)
 Race 6 – 12 
 Race 7 – 9 
 Race 8 – 4 
 Race 9 – 7 
 Race 10 – 2 
 Race 11 – 6 
 Final – 61 (→ 5th place)

Mixed High Performance Two Handed Dinghy (49er)
 Thomas Johanson and Jyrki Järvi
 Race 1 – 2 
 Race 2 – 7 
 Race 3 – 2 
 Race 4 – (12)
 Race 5 – 3 
 Race 6 – 4 
 Race 7 – 10 
 Race 8 – 6 
 Race 9 – 2 
 Race 10 – 4 
 Race 11 – 7 
 Race 12 – 2 
 Race 13 – 3 
 Race 14 – 1 
 Race 15 – 2 
 Race 16 – (13)
 Final – 55 (→  Gold Medal)

Swimming 

Men's 100 m Freestyle
 Jere Hård
 Preliminary Heat – 51.11 (→ did not advance)

Men's 100 m Butterfly
 Jere Hård
 Preliminary Heat – 53.67
 Semi-final – 53.65 (→ did not advance)
 Tero Välimaa
 Preliminary Heat – 54.24 (→ did not advance)

Men's 200 m Butterfly
 Tero Välimaa
 Preliminary Heat – 02:02.46 (→ did not advance)

Men's 100 m Breaststroke
 Jarno Pihlava
 Preliminary Heat – 01:02.21 (→ did not advance)

Men's 200 m Breaststroke
 Jarno Pihlava
 Preliminary Heat – 02:19.76 (→ did not advance)

Men's 200 m Individual Medley
 Jani Sievinen
 Preliminary Heat – 02:02.00
 Semi-final – 02:01.46
 Final – 02:02.49 (→ 8th place)

Men's 400 m Individual Medley
 Jani Sievinen
 Preliminary Heat – 04:25.16 (→ did not advance)

Men's 4 × 100 m Medley
 Jani Sievinen, Jarno Pihlava, Tero Välimaa, and Jere Hård
 Preliminary Heat – DSQ (→ did not advance)

Women's 50 m Freestyle
 Hanna-Maria Seppälä
 Preliminary Heat – 26.21 (→ did not advance)

Women's 100 m Freestyle
 Hanna-Maria Seppälä
 Preliminary Heat – 56.68 (→ did not advance)

Women's 100 m Butterfly
 Marja Pärssinen
 Preliminary Heat – 01:01.94 (→ did not advance)

Women's 100 m Backstroke
 Anu Koivisto
 Preliminary Heat – 01:03.44 (→ did not advance)

Women's 200 m Backstroke
 Anu Koivisto
 Preliminary Heat – 02:16.23 (→ did not advance)

Weightlifting

References

sports-reference
Wallechinsky, David (2004). The Complete Book of the Summer Olympics (Athens 2004 Edition). Toronto, Canada. . 
International Olympic Committee (2001). The Results. Retrieved 12 November 2005.
Sydney Organising Committee for the Olympic Games (2001). Official Report of the XXVII Olympiad Volume 1: Preparing for the Games. Retrieved 20 November 2005.
Sydney Organising Committee for the Olympic Games (2001). Official Report of the XXVII Olympiad Volume 2: Celebrating the Games. Retrieved 20 November 2005.
Sydney Organising Committee for the Olympic Games (2001). The Results. Retrieved 20 November 2005.
International Olympic Committee Web Site

Nations at the 2000 Summer Olympics
2000 Summer Olympics
2000 in Finnish sport